Geoffrey Tréand (born 16 January 1986) is a French professional footballer currently playing as a forward for Étoile Carouge FC.

Career
Tréand started his professional career by playing for Servette between 2005 and 2010, scoring 44 goals in 121 appearances, before transferring to Neuchâtel Xamax. After Xamax's bankruptcy in December 2011, Tréand signed for FC Sion. He was not able to establish himself in Sion's team, making only 6 appearances (5 as a substitute). On 18 June 2012, it was announced that Tréand had rejoined Servette on a three-year contract.

Tréand joined St. Gallen in July 2014 for a fee of £12,000. He left St Gallen on the expiration of his contract in summer 2016.

Ahead of the 2019/20 season, Tréand joined Étoile Carouge FC on a 1-year contract.

References

External links

1986 births
Living people
Association football forwards
French footballers
French expatriate footballers
French expatriate sportspeople in Switzerland
Swiss Super League players
Swiss Challenge League players
FC Sion players
Servette FC players
Neuchâtel Xamax FCS players
FC St. Gallen players
FC Aarau players
Étoile Carouge FC players
Expatriate footballers in Switzerland
People from Annemasse
Sportspeople from Haute-Savoie
Footballers from Auvergne-Rhône-Alpes